Corticium is a genus of sponges in the order Homosclerophorida.
first described by Eduard Oscar Schmidt in 1862.

Species
Accepted species as given by WoRMS:
Corticium acanthastrum 
Corticium bargibanti 
Corticium candelabrum 
Corticium diamantense 
Corticium furcatum 
Corticium monolophum 
Corticium niger 
Corticium quadripartitum 
Corticium simplex 
Corticium vaceleti 
Corticium verticillatum

Reference

Homoscleromorpha
Animals described in 1862
Taxa named by Eduard Oscar Schmidt